Sri Lanka competed in the 2019 South Asian Games in Kathmandu and Pokhara, Nepal from 1 to 10 December 2019.

Cricket
Sri Lanka sent under-23 teams to participate in both the men's and women's events by sending U23 teams.

Men
The following cricketers were selected in the team:
 Charith Asalanka (captain)
 Kamindu Mendis (vice captain)
 Pathum Nissanka
 Hasitha Boyagoda
 Vishwa Chathuranga
 Ashen Bandara 
 Shammu Ashan
 Nishan Madushka
 Jehan Daniel
 Asitha Fernando
 Kalana Perera
 Duvindu Tillekaratne
 Sachindu Colombage
 Kanishka Anjula

Women
The following cricketers were selected in the team:
 Harshitha Madavi (captain) 
 Kavisha Dilhari
 Sathya Sandeepani
 Umesha Thimashini
 Tharika Sewwandi
 Lihini Apsara
 Jimanjali Wijenayake
 Sachini Nisansala
 Nilakshana Sandamini
 Shayani Oshadi
 Malsha Ranatunga
 Tharuka Shehani
 Shikari Nuwantha
 Sachini de Silva
 Janadi Anali (TBR)

Medal summary
Sri Lanka won 40 gold medals and a total of 251 medals.

Medal table

See also 
Doping at the 2019 South Asian Games

References

Nations at the 2019 South Asian Games
2019
2019 in Sri Lankan sport